This uniform polyhedron compound is a composition of the 2 enantiomers of the snub dodecadodecahedron.

References 
.

Polyhedral compounds